The Altitude Radial Rocket is an American amateur-built aircraft, produced by the Altitude Group of Overland Park, Kansas. The aircraft is supplied as a kit for amateur construction.

Design and development
The aircraft features a cantilever low-wing, a two-seats-in-tandem enclosed cockpit under a bubble canopy, fixed conventional landing gear or retractable tricycle landing gear and a single radial engine in tractor configuration.

The aircraft is made from composites. The wing span and area as well as gross weight varies depending on the model.

Operational history
, six examples had been registered in the United States with the Federal Aviation Administration.

Variants
Radial Rocket RG
Retractable tricycle gear model. Construction time from the supplied kit is 2000 hours. Two were reported flying by the end of 2011.
Radial Rocket TD
Fixed taildragger gear model. Construction time from the supplied kit is 1900 hours. Four were reported flying by the end of 2011.

Specifications (Radial Rocket RG)

References

External links

Homebuilt aircraft
Single-engined tractor aircraft
Altitude Group aircraft
Low-wing aircraft
2000s United States sport aircraft